The Santa Fe Trail Remains, also known as Santa Fe Trail Ruts, are a two-mile (3 km) section of the former  long Santa Fe Trail, described as the "longest continuous stretch of clearly defined Santa Fe Trail rut remains in Kansas."  Now owned by a preservation organization, the site is visible from a pull-off area on United States Route 50 near Dodge City, Kansas.  The site was declared a National Historic Landmark in 1963.

Description
The actual trail route is crossed in several places, by US 50, a railroad right-of-way, and irrigation ditches. The ruts have also been harmed by past use of the property for grazing. The landscape looks much today as it did in the 19th century, except for these intrusions, as well as the shifting of the Arkansas River to follow a more southerly route than it did during the trail's period of use.

The Santa Fe Trail was one of the first great westward migration trails, inaugurated by trader William Becknell in 1821, connecting Independence, Missouri with Santa Fe, the capital of Spanish (and later Mexican) Nuevo México.  It served as a major conduit for the development of the American West, until it was effectively supplanted by railroads around 1880.  Much of the trail's route is known, but few traces of it survive.  Although there are other sections of Santa Fe Trail ruts that are listed on the National Register of Historic Places, this one is one of the longest and best-preserved.

See also
Oregon Trail Ruts (Guernsey, Wyoming)
National Register of Historic Places listings in Ford County, Kansas
List of National Historic Landmarks in Kansas

References

Geography of Ford County, Kansas
Historic trails and roads in Kansas
National Historic Landmarks in Kansas
Roads on the National Register of Historic Places in Kansas
Tourist attractions in Ford County, Kansas
Santa Fe Trail